Shush! is a BBC Radio 4 sitcom written by and starring Rebecca Front and Morwenna Banks. It follows child prodigy Alice and hapless Snoo as two librarians, trying desperately to keep their local library afloat. The first series was broadcast on BBC Radio 4 in September 2015, with the second series broadcast in May 2017.

The idea was originally developed with Armando Iannucci as a television programme, but was instead commissioned for radio in 2014, with the pilot episode being co-written by Father Ted creator Arthur Mathews. The series also stars Ben Willbond as local library inspector Simon Neilson, and Michael Fenton-Stevens as morally bankrupt celebrity surgeon Dr Cadogan. Guest stars so far have included Geoffrey Whitehead, Frances Barber and Laurence Fox and the show is produced by Pozzitive Television.

Episode List

Series one

Critical Reception 

Both series of Shush! have so far been very well received. David Hepworth, writing in The Guardian, praised its "lovely" moments, while Jane Anderson, reviewing for the Radio Times, wrote that "any comedy based upon an idea by Armando Iannucci has quality written all over it and this is no exception. Written by Morwenna Banks and Rebecca Front, who both star as socially challenged librarians, this is a rare Radio 4 sitcom grower.".

References 

2015 radio programme debuts